The Fighting Kentuckian is a 1949 American Adventure Western film written and directed by George Waggner and starring John Wayne, who also produced the film.  The supporting cast featured Vera Ralston; Philip Dorn; Oliver Hardy (of Laurel & Hardy) portraying Wayne's portly sidekick; Marie Windsor; John Howard; Hugo Haas; Grant Withers and Odette Myrtil.

Plot
Returning home from the War of 1812, John Breen, a Kentucky militiaman, falls in love with French exile Fleurette de Marchand. He discovers a plot to steal the land that Fleurette's exiles plan to settle on. Breen is mistaken for a land surveyor and is presented with a theodolite and sets out with Willie to look as if they are surveying (they do not actually know what to do).

A further pretense occurs when Breen sits on stage with a group of fiddlers and feigns being able to play.

Throughout the film, Breen's soldiers sing:
Only six hundred miles more to go
Only six hundred miles more to go
And if we can just get lucky
We will end up in Kentucky
Only six hundred miles more to go

When the song is first heard, there are eight hundred miles to go (the tune is "She'll Be Coming Round the Mountain").

Cast 
 John Wayne as John Breen
 Vera Ralston as Fleurette de Marchand
 Philip Dorn as Col. Georges Géraud
 Oliver Hardy as Willie Paine
 Marie Windsor as Ann Logan
 John Howard as Blake Randolph
 Hugo Haas as Gen. Paul de Marchand
 Grant Withers as George Hayden
 Odette Myrtil as Madame de Marchand
 Paul Fix as Beau Merritt
 Mae Marsh as Sister Hattie
 Jack Pennick as Capt. Dan Carroll
 Mickey Simpson as Jacques (wrestler/Marie's father)
 Fred Graham as Carter Ward
 Mabelle Koenig as Marie
 Hank Worden as Abner Todd (uncredited)
 Fred Aldrich as Militiaman (uncredited) 
 Richard Alexander as Militiaman (uncredited) 
 Hank Bell as Militiaman at Festival (uncredited)

Historical setting
The story is set in Alabama in 1818, including the city of Demopolis, which was founded by Bonapartists.  The Bonapartists had been exiled from France after the defeat of Napoleon I at the Battle of Waterloo.  Congress authorized the sale of four townships in the Alabama Territory in March 1817 at two dollars per acre, and Marengo County was created on February 7, 1818 from lands that had been taken from the Choctaw Nation under the Treaty of Fort St. Stephens.  It was named after Spinetta Marengo, Italy where Napoleon defeated Austria in 1800 in the Battle of Marengo.  The county seat, Linden, Alabama, was named after Hohenlinden, Bavaria where Napoleon won another victory against the Austrians.  The Bonapartist colony did not succeed overall, in part due to surveyance issues that contribute to the plot of the film and in part due to practical difficulties in establishing the vineyards.

Production notes
This is one of only five times that Hardy worked without partner Stan Laurel after they'd teamed up as Laurel and Hardy.  Hardy also appeared with Harry Langdon in Zenobia (1939), and in three cameos: Riding High, Barnum & Ringling, Inc. and Choo-Choo!  It was the only time that Hardy appeared in a film with John Wayne, though the two had worked together onstage a year earlier in a touring charity production of What Price Glory? starring Wayne, Ward Bond, and Maureen O'Hara, and directed by John Ford.
Re-broadcast by Arte 1 February 2017, the film credits celebrated composer Georges Antheil (1900-1959) with the music (background score including among things stirring "variations" on the Marseillaise).

The film was the second one produced by John Wayne for Republic Pictures. It was stuntman Chuck Roberson's first work with John Wayne; Roberson frequently doubled Wayne throughout his career. Wayne desired a French actress for the lead role and considered Danielle Darrieux, Simone Simon and Corinne Calvet but was forced to use Republic Studio's Vera Ralston causing other Czech and Austrian actors to be cast to match Ralston's accent.

The Fighting Kentuckian was one of only four films in which John Wayne wore a buckskin suit with a coonskin cap, the others being the 1930 widescreen epic The Big Trail (in the Grand Canyon sequence shot on location), Allegheny Uprising (1939), and as Davy Crockett in the concluding battle footage in The Alamo (1960). Allegheny Uprising and The Fighting Kentuckian, shot only a decade apart (as opposed to three decades apart, as is the case with The Big Trail and The Alamo), are often confused with each other because of Wayne's identical buckskin outfit and coonskin hat worn throughout both pictures.

See also
 Oliver Hardy filmography
 John Wayne filmography

References

External links 

 
 
 
 
 The Fighting Kentuckian at Famous Clowns

1949 films
1940s historical films
American historical films
Films directed by George Waggner
Films scored by George Antheil
Films produced by John Wayne
Films set in Alabama
Films set in the 1810s
Republic Pictures films
American black-and-white films
1940s American films